Woodstock '99 (also called Woodstock 1999) was a music festival held from July 22 to July 25, 1999, in Rome, New York. After Woodstock '94, it was the second large-scale music festival that attempted to emulate the original 1969 Woodstock festival. The attendance was approximately 220,000 over four days.

The cable network MTV covered the festival extensively, and live coverage was available on pay-per-view. Westwood One held its radio rights. Excerpts were released on CD and DVD.

The festival was marred by controversy and difficult environmental conditions, overpriced food and water, poor sanitation leading to sicknesses, sexual harassment and rapes, rioting, looting, vandalism, arson, violence and death. It has been described as, "notorious", "a flashpoint in cultural nadir", and like being "in another country during military conflict".

Promoters 

Michael Lang, one of the original co-founders of Woodstock, agreed to partner with John Scher, a successful New Jersey concert promoter, for a 30-years-on revival of the iconic festival.

Performers 

Many of the high profile acts such as DMX, Limp Bizkit, Korn, Red Hot Chili Peppers, Alanis Morissette, Kid Rock, Metallica, and Creed were popular or rising artists of the era. While no groups that performed at the original Woodstock festival took the stage at Woodstock 1999, there were individuals who did. John Entwistle of the Who performed a solo set and Mickey Hart (drummer of the Grateful Dead) played with his band Planet Drum. Jeff Beck was scheduled to perform but had to cancel due to a "scheduling conflict". He had been scheduled to perform at the original Woodstock festival; however, his band Jeff Beck Group broke up the week before. Although the Doors rejected an offer to play at the first Woodstock, their guitarist Robby Krieger was a surprise addition to Creed's set, after he was invited to perform "Roadhouse Blues" with Creed.

Foo Fighters were set to perform, but withdrew to finish work on There Is Nothing Left to Lose, coupled with guitarist Franz Stahl leaving the band. Sugar Ray was slated to appear at Woodstock 1999 but had to cancel due to lead singer Mark McGrath's illness. Al Green was also supposed to appear, but backed out following John F. Kennedy Jr.'s death in a plane crash.

Facilities 

The festival was held on the east side of Rome at the former Griffiss Air Force Base, a Superfund site. The U.S. Air Force had closed the B-52 base in September 1995, and it was later redeveloped as Griffiss Business and Technology Park.

The promoters were determined to avoid the gate-crashing that had occurred at previous festivals. They characterized the site as "defensible", thinking a  plywood and steel fence would keep out those without tickets. Attendees actually broke through a 100-foot section of this "Peace Wall" on Saturday night (not to get into the show, but to get out). Along with the fence, about 500 New York State Police troopers were planned to be providing additional security against gate-crashers.

In addition to two main stages, secondary venues were available. These included several alternate stages, a night-time rave tent, and a film festival (sponsored by the Independent Film Channel) held in a former airplane hangar.

Finances 

Woodstock '99 was conceived and executed as a commercial venture with dozens of corporate sponsors and included the presence of vendor "malls" and modern accoutrements such as ATMs and email stations. Advance tickets for the event were priced at $150 plus service charges, at the time considered costly for a festival of this type. Tickets purchased at the gate cost $180.

There were about 400,000 attendees. A total of 186,983 tickets were sold according to reports shortly after the festival, which "translates into a gross take of $28,864,748" at the time. Ticket sales were advertised as being capped at 250,000, the capacity of the venue. It has been estimated that ticket sales were worth $60 million in revenue, but that number appears to have been based on believing there were 400,000 paid attendees. It has been suggested that ticket sales were underreported to avoid extra contractual payouts to the hosting community:Perhaps the discrepancy stems from the deal between Woodstock '99 promoters and the Griffiss Local Development Corporation (GLDC). MTV cites that the GLDC, the city of Rome, and Oneida County were expected to receive $1 million to host the festival and an additional $250,000 if ticket sales topped 200,000.

Any tickets sold beyond 200,000 would then result in an additional $5 (per ticket) paid to all parties. While it's clear more than 186,983 people attended Woodstock '99, on paper, only that many tickets had been recorded being sold.
Based on that figure, the promoters wouldn’t have been required to dish out the extra money it had promised the GLDC.The promoters stated $38 million in original production costs (not including damages, fees, and emergency costs for extra security). Promoters had originally budgeted the festival at $30 million.

Rome (especially the downtown area and the commercial areas adjacent to the festival site) became a major draw for attendees, who patronized its bars, restaurants, and stores and stayed in its hotels and motels for the concert’s duration. It was estimated that tourists spent $30-$40 million in the area by the Oneida County Convention and Visitors Bureau.

Woodstock '99 was simulcast on pay-per-view television, with early reports of 500,000 purchases. In addition to documenting the performers, MTV's pay-per-view coverage included coverage of the site and vox pop interviews with attendees, which some reporters later considered to resemble gonzo journalism. With 500,000 purchases of three-day simulcast passes at $59.95 each, revenues could have been as high as $30 million. Five years earlier, Woodstock '94 had made over $9 million on its pay-per-view sales to 220,000 households. Other revenue came from CD and DVD sales after the festival. "We knew we'd never make a significant on-site profit," Scher says. "It's all about the after-show marketing. We believe that we have a great event to build upon."

Vendors 

Vendors paid $500 to sell at Woodstock during the 4-day festival. There were many non-vendors who attempted to sell on a smaller scale on the paths to and from the concert and camping areas.

Reception 

The festival featured a diverse assortment of acts, early reviews for many of which were positive. Critics particularly praised performances by George Clinton, Jamiroquai, James Brown, Limp Bizkit, Insane Clown Posse, Sevendust, DMX, Sheryl Crow, the Tragically Hip, and Rage Against the Machine. However, critical and public attention would quickly turn to the deteriorating environment and crowd behavior.

Controversy 

Organizers had attempted to hold a European leg of the festival in Wiener Neustadt, Austria, the weekend prior to the upstate New York concert. This version of the festival was ultimately cancelled. In announcing the cancellation, Michael Lang stated that more time was required in order to be able to hold a safe Woodstock event.

Environment and health 

Oppressive heat—which reached above —and difficult environmental conditions marred the festival from early on. The former Griffiss AFB included large areas of concrete and asphalt with little or no shade, placing the entire facility within its own heat island. This effect not only caused temperatures to rise during the day, but also kept them elevated at night. There was not enough room on grassy areas for many campers to set up their tents, and some resorted to camping on asphalt.

Participants were met with high prices once inside. Food and water sold by onsite vendors was expensive; the vendors were subcontractors whose contract with the organizers gave them complete control over pricing, which they took advantage of to continue raising prices throughout the festival as supplies wore thin and attendees became agitated. As an alternative, festival-goers faced a long trek or cramped travel via looping buses to Rome's modest shopping areas, where stores had long lines and low stock; however, most outside food and drink was confiscated by security. People stood in long lines to access the free water fountains, until frustration led a few concertgoers to break the pipes to provide water to those in the middle of the line, in turn creating many large mud pits.

Performers Wyclef Jean and Kid Rock demanded that the concertgoers pelt the stage with stray plastic water bottles during their sets.

The number of toilets installed proved insufficient for the number of attendees. Within a short time, some facilities (notably the on-site portable toilets and showers) were unusable and overflowing. Excrement from the toilets flowed into the mud pits created by the broken water main, leading to attendees covered in waste and cases of trench mouth and trench foot.

Sexual assaults, violence, and death 

During The Offspring's performance, singer Dexter Holland complained to the crowd about seeing women in the audience getting groped, as did Red Hot Chili Peppers bassist Flea during their set. At least five rapes and numerous other sexual assaults and harassment were reported to authorities. Eyewitnesses reported a crowd-surfing woman being pulled down into the crowd and assaulted in the mosh pit during Limp Bizkit's set. During the post-stage rave on Saturday night, an apparently intoxicated man stole and drove a truck into the rave hangar during Fatboy Slim's set. Staff reported seeing a teenager being raped in the back of the truck while attempting to remove it from the hangar area, and Slim and his entourage were asked to evacuate the premises. A volunteer also reported seeing a gang-rape during Korn's performance.

Violence and vandalism occurred during and after the Saturday night performance by Limp Bizkit; this included fans tearing plywood from the walls during a performance of the song "Break Stuff". The band's vocalist, Fred Durst, stated during the concert, "Don't let anybody get hurt. But I don't think you should mellow out. That's what Alanis Morissette had you motherfuckers do. If someone falls, pick 'em up." Durst said during a performance of the band's hit song "Nookie", "We already let all the negative energy out. It's time to reach down and bring that positive energy to this motherfucker. It's time to let yourself go right now, 'cause there are no motherfuckin' rules out there."

Widely blamed for inciting the crowd to violence, Durst later stated in an interview, "I didn't see anybody getting hurt. You don't see that. Former Limp Bizkit manager Peter Katsis defended Durst in an interview for Netflix' 2022 documentary on the festival, claiming that “pointing the finger at Fred is about the last thing anybody should do. There really isn’t a way to control 300,000 people. The best thing he could do is put on the best show possible, and that’s what he did.”

The "Peace Patrol" security officers were unarmed, unqualified, and often uninterested in performing their duty; many simply sold their spare security uniforms to other concertgoers.

A man named David DeRosia collapsed in the mosh pit during Metallica’s performance. Concert medical staff initially tried to treat his symptoms, which were seizures, and what doctors suspected to be a drug overdose. DeRosia was transported to the Air Force base medical center and was then airlifted to University Hospital in Syracuse. The following afternoon, he had fallen into a coma and a doctor had diagnosed him with "hyperthermia, probably secondary to heat stroke". DeRosia died at 12:09 pm on Monday, July 26, having never awoken. The autopsy report ruled the death as accidental and listed the cause of death to be hyperthermia, along with an enlarged heart and obesity. In 2001, DeRosia's mother filed a lawsuit in New York Supreme Court against the promoters of Woodstock 1999 and six doctors who worked at the event; the lawsuit stated that DeRosia died because concert promoters were negligent by not providing enough fresh water and adequate medical care for 400,000 attendees.

Two other deaths were reported during the festival. A 44-year-old "succumbed to the heat" on Friday; he had been an attendee of Woodstock '69. A 28-year-old woman was hit by a car while walking along the road when leaving the concert.

Violence escalated the final night during the concert’s last hours as Red Hot Chili Peppers performed on the east stage and Megadeth performed on the west stage. A group of peace promoters, led by the anti-gun violence organization PAX (later renamed the Center to Prevent Youth Violence), had distributed candles to those stopping at their booth during the day, intending them for a candlelight vigil for the victims of the Columbine High School massacre to be held during the Chili Peppers' performance of the song "Under the Bridge"; this had not been mentioned to or approved by local firefighting authorities. During the band's set the crowd began to light the candles, with some also using candles and lighters to start bonfires. Hundreds of empty plastic water bottles that littered the lawn area were used as fuel for the fire, which had spread to both stages by the end of the performances. After the band finished their main set, the audience was informed about "a bit of a problem." An audio tower had caught fire and the fire department was called in to extinguish it; Scher claims that they refused the call.

Back onstage for an encore, the Chili Peppers' lead singer Anthony Kiedis compared the fires to the 1979 film Apocalypse Now. The fire escalated into violence and vandalism, resulting in the intervention of New York State Police riot control squads.

The band was blamed in the media for inciting the riots after performing a cover of the Jimi Hendrix song "Fire". Kiedis wrote in his autobiography, Scar Tissue, that Hendrix's sister had instead asked them to play "Fire" in honor of Hendrix and his performance at the original Woodstock festival. He continued: "It was clear that this situation had nothing to do with Woodstock anymore. It wasn't symbolic of peace and love, but of greed and cashing in."

Many large, high bonfires were burning before the band left the stage for the last time. Participants danced in circles around the fires. Looking for more fuel, some tore off plywood panels from the supposedly inviolable security perimeter fence. ATMs were tipped over and broken into, trailers full of merchandise and equipment were forced open and burglarized, and abandoned vendor booths were turned over and set afire. It was reported that approximately $22,000 was robbed from ATMs.

MTV evacuated its entire crew which had been providing live coverage of the festival. Host Kurt Loder described the scene in USA Today:

By 11:45pm, a large force of 500-700 state troopers, local police officers, and various other law enforcement arrived. Most had riot control gear and proceeded to form a riot-line that flushed the crowd to the northwest, away from the stage located at the eastern end of the airfield. Some reports state that few of the crowd offered strong resistance, and they dispersed back toward the campground and out the main entrance. Others claim that the riot line allowed the concertgoers to "tire themselves out" in the campground area and that the fires were not contained until "well after sunrise".

Aftermath 
Reports suggest 42 to 44 people were arrested over the course of the festival. Ten state troopers and two state police supervisors were reportedly demoted or suspended for their behavior at the festival:A supervisor of two state troopers who had posed with naked female attendees was suspended; a New York State prison guard was charged with sodomizing a 15-year-old girl during the riots; 253 people had been treated at area hospitals. The official numbers of fans treated on-site is between 4,000 and 4,500, yet Dr. Richard Kaskiw, one of the few area doctors who worked the medical tents, says that he was told by Vuoculo—who issued the official stats—that the numbers were far higher, the 8,000 to 10,000 range.Shortly afterwards, the New York State Department of Health reported 5,162 medical cases related to the festival.

After the concert, members of the National Organization for Women (NOW) gathered outside the New York offices of one of the promoters to protest the sexual violence against women which had occurred. Police investigated four instances of rape that occurred during the concert. In October 2000, a woman sued Oneida County and Michael Lang for personal injury over sexual assault at the festival.

Several lawsuits by concert-goers against the promoters for dehydration and distress were announced.

The New York Times solicited festival performers Rage Against the Machine for their opinion of the festival's controversy. Tom Morello, the band's guitarist, wrote on August 5, 1999, in Neil Strauss's Times column:

It took three weeks to clean up the site after the festival. Organizers spent an estimated $78,000 re-sodding the grounds in the stage and mosh pit areas. Approximately 12 trailers, a small bus, and a number of booths and portable toilets were damaged by fire in the fray; some of the trailers were refrigerated and had coolant or propane tanks that exploded, which can be seen in video footage.

Following the event, San Francisco Examiner journalist Jane Ganahl cast doubt on the ability to promote another high-profile Woodstock concert and described the event as "the day the music died".

Event schedule 

During the four days of the festival, various bands and artists performed on one of the three different stages: "West Stage", "East Stage", and "Emerging Artists Stage".

July 22, 1999 (Thursday) (pre-show)

West Stage 

 Frostbit Blue
 K.J. James
 Little Big Jam
 Gridley Paige
 Djoliba
 Red Herring
 Rattlebasket
 In Bloom
 Flipp
 3rd Bass
 Vertical Horizon
 Strangefolk
 G. Love & Special Sauce
 The String Cheese Incident
 Bernie Worrell and the Woo Warriors
 George Clinton & the P-Funk All-Stars

AMP3.com Emerging Artists Stage 

 Immoral Fibres
 Simmi
 Chris Glenn
 Gary Durdin & The Clay Pinps
 Johnny Rushmore

July 23, 1999 (Friday)

East Stage 

 James Brown
 G. Love & Special Sauce
 Jamiroquai
 Live
 Sheryl Crow
 DMX
 The Offspring
 Korn
 Bush

West Stage 

 Spitfire
 Oleander
 The Umbilical Brothers
 moe.
 Lit
 Buckcherry
 The Roots
 Insane Clown Posse
 George Clinton & the P-Funk All-Stars

Emerging Artists Stage 

 F.o.N.
 Linda Rutherford & Celtic Fire
 Animal Planet
 Sugar Daddy
 Sticky Pistil
 Bijou Phillips
 Mike Errico
 King Konga
 Ben Lee
 Beth Hart Band
 Liars Inc.
 Chris McDermott
 Moby

July 24, 1999 (Saturday)

East Stage 

 The Tragically Hip
 Kid Rock
 Wyclef Jean with the Refugee Allstars
 Counting Crows
 Dave Matthews Band
 Alanis Morissette
 Limp Bizkit
 Rage Against the Machine
 Metallica

West Stage 

 Spitfire
 Guster
 Bruce Hornsby
 Everclear
 Ice Cube
 Los Lobos
 Mickey Hart/Planet Drum
 The Chemical Brothers

Rave Tent 

 Young & Fabulous!
 Gargantua Soul
 3
 Serial Joe
 American Pearl
 Full Devil Jacket
 Old Pike
 Strangefolk
 DDT
 2 Skinnee J's
 Gigolo Aunts
 Fatboy Slim

July 25, 1999 (Sunday)

East Stage 

 Willie Nelson
 The Brian Setzer Orchestra
 Everlast
 Elvis Costello
 Jewel
 Creed, featuring Robby Krieger
 Red Hot Chili Peppers

West Stage 

 Spitfire
 Mike Ness
 Our Lady Peace
 Rusted Root
 Sevendust
 Collective Soul
 Godsmack
 Megadeth

Emerging Artists Stage 

 Kirsti Gholson
 Moe Loughran
 The Scoldees
 The Supersuckers
 Stormy Mondays
 Big Sugar
 Muse
 John Oszajca
 Pound
 Pushmonkey
 Cyclefly
 Indigenous
 John Entwistle
 Reveille

Recordings 
Music from Woodstock 1999 was released on a two-disc compact disc set, Woodstock 1999. The album features 32 performing artists and was released on Epic Records on October 19, 1999.

A DVD of concert highlights entitled Woodstock 99 was released in March 2000. It features the more positive aspects of the concerts with one song each from 29 of the participating acts, along with interviews from the musicians and concert-goers.

Most of the Bush performance is available on the DVD The Best of '94–'99.

Documentaries 

The Ringer has produced an eight-part documentary podcast series on the Luminary hosting site. Entitled Break Stuff: The Story of Woodstock '99, the show is a look back at the concert, the venue, the artists, the violence and the truths and misconceptions on what caused Woodstock '99 to be such a disaster.

The documentary Woodstock 99: Peace, Love, and Rage, directed by Garret Price, premiered on July 23, 2021, on HBO and HBO Max.

On August 3, 2022, Netflix premiered a three-part documentary titled Trainwreck: Woodstock '99, directed by Jamie Crawford, with new interviews with concertgoers, journalists present at the festival, artists who performed at the festival, and co-promoters John Scher and Michael Lang.

See also 

 Pol'and'Rock Festival, formerly known as Przystanek Woodstock (1995–present)
 
 Heroes of Woodstock Tour (2009)
 Woodstock '79 (1979)
 Woodstock '89 (1989)
 Woodstock '94 (1994)
 Woodstock '99 (1999)
 Woodstock 50 (2019)
 Woodstock (1969)

References

External links 
 Original Woodstock 1999 website
 'Live' Woodstock Report Including Riot Photos
 Woodstock Museum

1999 in New York (state)
1999 music festivals
1999 riots
Crimes in New York (state)
Music riots
Rock festivals in the United States
Riots and civil disorder in New York (state)
Rome, New York
Sexual violence at riots and crowd disturbances
Woodstock Festival
July 1999 events in the United States
Concert disasters
1999 controversies in the United States